Leslie Taylor (born 4 December 1956 in North Shields, Northumberland) is an English former footballer who captained Watford in the 1984 FA Cup Final. He played as a hard-working central-midfielder. Graham Taylor, his Watford manager, described him as "sniffer and a ratter".

Career
Taylor started his career at Oxford United, signing professional terms in December 1974. He moved to Watford in November 1980 for £100,000 plus Keith Cassells. He was part of the Watford side that achieved promotion to Division One in the 1981–82 season, winning the Player of the Season award that year.

In the 1983–84 season Watford reached the final of the FA Cup. Watford's captain, Wilf Rostron, was sent off in a league fixture against Luton Town preceding the final and incurred a suspension. Therefore, it was Taylor that led Watford out at Wembley. Watford would go on to lose 2–0 to Everton.

Taylor moved on loan to Reading in October 1986 and signed for them permanently in December that year for £20,000. For the same fee he moved to Colchester United in January 1989. He played for the Essex club until retirement in 1990.

Taylor returned to Oxford in 1992. He became United's under-16 coach and is still with the club, now working as Youth Development Officer.

Honours

Club
Watford
 Football League First Division Runner-up (1): 1982–83
 Football League Second Division Runner-up (1): 1981–82
 FA Cup Runner-up (1): 1983–84

Reading
 Full Members Cup Winner (1): 1987–88

Individual
 PFA Team of the Year (1): 1977–78

References

1956 births
Living people
English footballers
Oxford United F.C. players
Watford F.C. players
Reading F.C. players
Colchester United F.C. players
Sportspeople from North Shields
Footballers from Tyne and Wear
Wallsend Boys Club players
Oxford United F.C. non-playing staff
Association football midfielders
FA Cup Final players